Brian Schroeder, better known as Pushead, is an American graphic artist. He is best known for his album covers and other merchandise for bands in the hardcore punk and heavy metal genres.

Career
Originally from Boise, Idaho, Schoeder formed the hardcore band Septic Death in 1981. During this period he developed a career as an artist under the name Pushead, and made that his primary occupation after the band split in 1986. 

His artwork, often featuring gruesome depictions of skeletons and corpses, first gained popularity in the skateboarding world due to his artwork being printed as skateboard deck graphics for the company Zorlac starting circa 1981 and continued for nearly a decade. His artwork was also noted by artists in the early hardcore and thrash metal scenes in the 1980s, and later by musicians in several other genres. He has designed album covers, T-shirts, posters, and other merchandise for musicians including Metallica, Misfits, Travis Barker, Kool Keith, and many others. He has also designed for the skateboarding subculture, including regular items associated with Thrasher magazine.   

Pushead operated the record labels Pusmort and Bacteria Sour. In recent years his designs have appeared on sneakers, particularly commemorative items released by Metallica, as well as limited edition products from Nike. His work has also appeared on a special edition electric guitar by ESP.

References

External links
 The Album Art of Brian "Pushead" Schroeder

Album-cover and concert-poster artists
Living people
Year of birth missing (living people)